Tennessee's 12th Senate district is one of 33 districts in the Tennessee Senate. It has been represented by Republican Ken Yager since 2008.

Geography
District 12 covers Campbell, Fentress, Morgan, Pickett, Rhea, Roane, and Scott Counties in rural East Tennessee. Communities in the district include Dayton, LaFollette, Harriman, Kingston, Rockwood, Oneida, Coalfield, Jamestown, Byrdstown, and part of Oak Ridge.

The district is largely located within Tennessee's 3rd congressional district, also extending into the 2nd, 4th, and 6th districts. It overlaps with the 31st, 32nd, 36th, 38th, and 41st districts of the Tennessee House of Representatives. and borders the state of Kentucky.

Recent election results
Tennessee Senators are elected to staggered four-year terms, with odd-numbered districts holding elections in midterm years and even-numbered districts holding elections in presidential years.

2020

2016

2012

Federal and statewide results in District 12

References

12
Campbell County, Tennessee
Fentress County, Tennessee
Morgan County, Tennessee
Pickett County, Tennessee
Rhea County, Tennessee
Roane County, Tennessee
Scott County, Tennessee